is a Prefectural Natural Park in central Mie Prefecture, Japan. Established in 1967, the park spans the municipalities of Taiki and Ōdai.

See also
 National Parks of Japan

References

Parks and gardens in Mie Prefecture
Protected areas established in 1967
1967 establishments in Japan